Jehan Georges Vibert or Jean Georges Vibert (30 September 1840 – 28 July 1902) was a French academic painter.

Biography

He was born in Paris, the son of engraver and publisher Théodore Vibert, and grandson of the influential rose-breeder Jean-Pierre Vibert. He began his artistic training at a young age under the instruction of his maternal grandfather, engraver Jean-Pierre-Marie Jazet. Vibert was more interested in painting than engraving and entered the studio of Félix-Joseph Barrias and eventually the École des Beaux-Arts when he was sixteen. He remained at the École for six years under the instruction of history painter François-Edouard Picot.

Vibert debuted at the Salon of 1863 with La Sieste (The Siesta) and Repentir (Repentance).

During the Franco-Prussian War, Vibert became a sharpshooter and was wounded at the battle of Malmaison in October 1870.  In recognition of his sacrifice, he was awarded a Knight in France's Legion of Honour on 18 June 1870, which was upgraded to the Legion of Honour rank of Officer on 18 February 1882.

Vibert submitted work to the Salon until 1899. The popularity of his works spread, notably in America, and fetched high prices including commissions from John Jacob Astor IV and William Vanderbilt. A large collection of works by Vibert was amassed by the heiress May Louise Maytag on behalf of then bishop of Miami Coleman Carroll, who greatly fancied them. This large cache was then donated to the Florida seminary St. John Vianney College in Miami. At this location the impressive collection has had a somewhat checkered conservation history, as well as exhibition history due to the discomfiture of later bishops with the seeming anti-clericalism of the paintings (lighthearted debaucheries, etc.).

Death
Vibert died on 28 July 1902, and is buried at the Père-Lachaise cemetery (4th division) in Paris.

Gallery

See also

 Legion of Honour
 List of Legion of Honour recipients by name (V)
 Legion of Honour Museum

References

External links

 
Vibert at the Albright Knox Art Gallery
Vibert at the Metropolitan Museum of Art
Vibert at the Haggin Museum

1840 births
1902 deaths
19th-century French painters
French male painters
Anti-clerical art
Burials at Père Lachaise Cemetery
Chevaliers of the Légion d'honneur
Officiers of the Légion d'honneur
19th-century French male artists